The Blind Side: Evolution of a Game is a book by Michael Lewis released on September 2, 2006 by W. W. Norton & Company. It focuses on American football.

Plot
The book features two dominant storylines. The first is an examination of how offensive football strategy has evolved over the past three decades in large part due to linebacker Lawrence Taylor's arrival in the 1980s and how this evolution has placed an increased importance on the role of the offensive left tackle. Most quarterbacks are right-handed and in order to throw, they stand with their left shoulders facing down field. Thus, they turn their backs to linebackers and other defenders pass rushing from the left side, creating a vulnerable "blind side" that the left tackle must protect. Taylor's speed and power changed the role of outside linebacker to become a more attacking, aggressive position. This in turn caused teams to emphasize larger and more agile left tackles.

The second storyline features Michael Oher, the former left tackle for the Ole Miss football team, and later right tackle for the Baltimore Ravens.  Lewis follows Oher from his impoverished upbringing through his years at Briarcrest Christian School, his adoption by Sean (Michael Lewis's former schoolmate) and Leigh Anne Tuohy and on to his position as one of the most highly coveted prospects in college football.

Film adaptation

The 2009 film The Blind Side was directed by John Lee Hancock and primarily follows the story of Michael Oher. It stars Quinton Aaron as Oher, along with Sandra Bullock, Tim McGraw, and Kathy Bates. It also features appearances by several past and present college football coaches playing themselves.

References

External links
 
 
  Michael Lewis tells the story of Michael Oher.
 

2006 non-fiction books
American football books
Books by Michael Lewis
Non-fiction books adapted into films